Josselin is a commune in north-western France. It may also refer to
Given name
Josselin de Rohan (born 1938), French politician
Josselin Henry (born 1982), French sport shooter
Josselin Ouanna (born 1986), French tennis player

Surname
J.P.B. de Josselin de Jong (1886–1964), Dutch anthropologist
Jean Josselin (born 1940), French boxer
Jean-Marie Josselin, Hawaiian chef
P.E. de Josselin de Jong (1922–1999), Dutch anthropologist
Pieter de Josselin de Jong (1861–1906), Dutch painter
Ralph Josselin (1617–1683), English vicar
Tessa de Josselin (born 1989), Australian actress

Other
Joslyn Castle  in Omaha, Nebraska, United States

See also
Jocelyn